NASA Categories of Evidence comprise a matrix or scale denoting the sources of evidence provided in the Human Research Program's various evidence reports, and thus potentially their probative value and efficacy. Authors in the Program were urged to label their evidence according to whether it was based on controlled experiments, observation, or expert opinion.

References

Human spaceflight
NASA